Annotations to Records of the Three Kingdoms by Pei Songzhi (372-451) is an annotation completed in the 5th century of the 3rd century historical text Records of the Three Kingdoms, compiled by Chen Shou. After leaving his native land, Pei Songzhi became the Gentleman of Texts under the Liu Song Dynasty, and was given the assignment of editing the book, which was completed in 429. This became the official history of the Three Kingdoms period, under the title Sanguozhi zhu (zhu meaning "notes"). He went about providing detailed explanations to some of the geography and other elements mentioned in the original. More importantly, he made corrections to the work, in consultation with records he collected of the period. In regard to historical events and figures, as well as Chen Shou's opinions, he added his own commentary. From his broad research, he was able to create a history which was relatively complete, without many of the loose ends of the original. Some of the added material was colourful and of questionable authenticity, possibly fictional. All the additional material made the book close to twice the length of the original. Pei Songzhi scrupulously cited his sources, and always introduced his opinion as such.

List of texts used in Pei Songzhi's annotations

Official and private histories

Government documents

Individual, family, and group biographies

Encyclopoediae, dictionaries, and references

Poetry, essays, philosophy, and literature

Correspondence

Classics
Quoting classics was an inescapable reality of Chinese political and academic life as early as the Eastern Zhou period. Pei Songzhi often cites classics in order to contextualize quotations made by speakers in Chen Shou's original text, and occasionally to explain the philosophy or background behind a person's actions. These works do not constitute historical sources for Pei Songzhi's purposes, but are included here for sake of completeness.

Texts of uncertain identity or disputable citation

Other sources
Pei Songzhi occasionally quotes other historians without citing any book or document title. Sun Sheng, Gan Bao, and Xi Zuochi are especially common. These may have been marginal notes in Pei's copy of Records of the Three Kingdoms, or personal notes to which he had access. Rarely, Pei Songzhi will report hearsay without any attribution.

Notes

References

Bibliography
Crump, J.I., Jr., transl. Chan-Kuo Ts'e. Oxford: Clarendon Press, 1971.
Fang Xuanling inter al., eds. 晉書 (Book of Jin), 648. Beijing: Zhonghua Publishing, 1974. 10 vols.
Gao Min (高敏), 《三國志》裴松之注引書考 ("Books Used by Pei Songzhi on Noting of History of the Three Kingdoms"). Journal of Henan University of Science and Technology (Social Science), 25.3 (June 2007), pp 5–21.
Lu Ji, 陸機集 (Collected Works of Lu Ji), Jin Taosheng (金濤聲), ed. Beijing: Zhonghua Publishing, 1982.
Lu Yaodong (逯耀東), 裴松之三國志注引雜傳集釋 ("Collected Explanations of Various Biographies Cited in Pei Songzhi's Annotation of Records of the Three Kingdoms"). 台大歷史學報, 1 (May 1974), pp 1–18.
Pei Songzhi, 三國志注 (Annotated Records of the Three Kingdoms). 429. Hong Kong: Zhonghua Publishing, 1971. 5 vols.
Qian Daxin, 廿二史考異 (Examination of Discrepancies in the Twenty-Two Histories). 1797. Cited in Gao.
Schaberg, David, A Patterned Past: Form and Thought in Early Chinese Historiography. Cambridge: Harvard University Press, 2001.
Shen Jiaben, 沉簃籍先生遺書乙篇 (Mr Shen Yiji's Leftover Documents, Volume Two). 1910s. Cited in Gao.
Wang Zuyi (王祖彝), 三國志人名錄 (List of Personal Names in Records of the Three Kingdoms). Commercial Press, 1956. Cited in Gao.
Wei Zheng inter al., eds. 隋書 (Book of Sui), 636. Beijing: Zhonghua Publishing, 1973. 6 vols. 
Zhao Yi, 廿二史劄記 (Notebook of the Twenty-Two Histories). 1770s. Cited in Gao.

External links
 
Records of the Three Kingdoms 《三國志》 Chinese text compiled by Chen Shou with annotations by Pei Songzhi and matching English vocabulary

5th-century history books
Chinese history texts
History books about the Three Kingdoms